Yuri Aleksandrovich Senkevich (March 4, 1937 in Choibalsan, Mongolia – September 25, 2003 in Moscow, Russia) was a Soviet doctor, and scientist. He is a Candidate of Sciences (PhD equivalent degree). Became famous in the USSR and worldwide for his participation in the Ra Expedition, in which he sailed together with Thor Heyerdahl.

Senkevich was born to Russian parents in Mongolia. In 1960, he graduated from the Military Medical Academy in Leningrad. After his graduation, he received an assignment as a military doctor. In 1962, Senkevich started at Moscow Institute of Aviation and Cosmic Medicine of the Ministry of Defence. On June 1, 1965, he was selected into Medical Group 2 (along with Yevgeni Illyin, Aleksandr Kiselyov) for the long-duration Voskhod flights in space, all of which were subsequently canceled to make way for the Soviet Moon program. All three were dismissed at the beginning of the following year. He continued his career in that field at the Institute of Medical and Biological Problems of the Ministry of Public Health. From 1966 to 1967, he participated in the 12th Soviet Antarctic expedition at Vostok station.

In 1969, Thor Heyerdahl invited Senkevich to sail on the Ra papyrus boat, and later on Ra II in 1970. Yuri Senkevich also sailed on the Tigris across the Indian Ocean.

In 1973, Senkevich began his career as a host of the "Travelers' Club" (Клуб путешественников), a show on the Soviet Central Television. During the 30 years, he visited as a journalist more than 200 countries. For his lifetime contribution to the television, he was awarded "TEFI", a prize of Russian Academy of Television, in 1997. Yuri Senkevich is in the Guinness Book of Records as "the world's longest serving TV anchorman".

He had a son, Nikolay Senkevich, who later became head of the NTV channel. He died of heart failure.

References

External links 
 Книга Юрия Сенкевича «На „Ра“ через Атлантику»
 Astronaut.ru — Юрий Александрович Сенкевич

1937 births
2003 deaths
Russian physicians
Russian explorers
Soviet military doctors
Russian and Soviet polar explorers
Soviet scientists
Soviet television presenters
Recipients of the Order of Friendship of Peoples
Russian television presenters
S.M. Kirov Military Medical Academy alumni
20th-century Russian journalists